This is a list of episodes of the Aquarion Evol anime series. As the sequel to the 2005 anime series Genesis of Aquarion, Aquarion Evol is also produced by studio Satelight, with direction by Shoji Kawamori, now accompanied by Yūsuke Yamamoto and music compositions by Yoko Kanno.  It was broadcast in Japan on TV Tokyo from January 8 to June 24, 2012.

So far four pieces of music were used as opening and ending songs. Several pieces of music from the original Aquarion series' soundtrack are also featured as insert songs, among brand new compositions.

Episode list

Notes

Aquarion Evol